Kemayan is a small town in Bera District, Pahang, Malaysia.

Demographics
Most residents are Chinese.

Gallery

References

Bera District
Towns in Pahang